Samuela Leuii (born 4 June 1972) is a Samoan boxer. He competed in the men's light heavyweight event at the 1996 Summer Olympics.

References

External links
 

1972 births
Living people
Samoan male boxers
Olympic boxers of Samoa
Boxers at the 1996 Summer Olympics
Place of birth missing (living people)
Light-heavyweight boxers